Jan Mandijn or Jan Mandyn (c. 1500, Haarlem – c. 1560, Antwerp) was a Dutch Renaissance painter, who worked in Antwerp after 1530.

Biography
Mandijn trained in Haarlem.  He moved to Antwerp in 1530.

He was the teacher of Jan van der Elburcht, Gillis Mostaert and Bartholomeus Spranger. He died in Antwerp.

Work

Only one signed work of Mandijn survives, the Temptation of Saint Anthony (Frans Hals Museum in Haarlem).  It is similar in style to Hieronymus Bosch and that is why he is called a follower of Bosch. This is confirmed by the early biographer Karel van Mander who wrote that Mandijn was good at painting spooky and funny scenes like Hieronymus Bosch. The 'Temptation' is inspired by Bosch's work, but Mandijn's style was freer and looser and the colours and fantastic creatures are less harmonious.  As a result, the whole is less powerful than Bosch. Mandijn's paintings incorporate the elements typical of Bosch such as hybrid demons composed of various parts of insects, amphibians, reptiles and birds.

The stylistic features of Mandijn's style have been identified in a series of Antwerp 'devil pictures' that have been attributed to him, such as the Temptation of Saint Christopher (Alte Pinakothek in Munich).

A recent study showed that Mandijn was also proficient in the "antique" manner. In 1552, for instance, the painter and his workshop completed a monumental altarpiece in a classicizing style for the Church of Saint Eustace in Zichem. The triptych with scenes from the life of Saint Eustace is still preserved in the afore-mentioned church.

References

External links

1500 births
1560 deaths
Dutch Renaissance painters
Artists from Haarlem